factotum is a password management and authentication protocol negotiation virtual file system  for Plan 9 from Bell Labs. When a program wants to authenticate to a service, it requests a key from factotum. If factotum does not have the key, it requests it from the users either via the terminal window or auth/fgui which is then stored in volatile memory. factotum then authenticates to the service on 
behalf of the program. For long term storage, keys are usually stored in secstore or in an encrypted file.

See also

 Comparison of password managers
 List of password managers
 Password manager
 Cryptography

External links 
 factotum(4) in Plan 9 Programmer's Manual, Volume 1.
 factotum(4) in 9front.
 Security in Plan 9  in Plan 9 Programmer's Manual, Volume 2.

Plan 9 from Bell Labs
Password managers